Microbacterium esteraromaticum is a rod shaped, gram positive species of bacteria under genus Microbacterium. Its G+C content of DNA is 69.3 to 69.7 mol%. It has other name, that is Flavobacterium esteraromaticum. In a culture of 30 degree Celsius it grows best.

References

External links
Type strain of Microbacterium esteraromaticum at BacDive -  the Bacterial Diversity Metadatabase	

esteraromaticum